Ryan Mellon is a former Gaelic footballer who played for the Moy club and the Tyrone county team.

Mellon was part of Tyrone's All-Ireland and league winning team of 2005. Mellon scored two goals in the final group stage match of the 2005 league which denied then champions Kerry a place in the semi-finals; although Tyrone lost 2–17 to 3–8, the county progressed and went on to win the league. Mellon retired from inter-county football in late 2010.

References

1980 births
Living people
Tyrone inter-county Gaelic footballers